The 1914 Tempe Normal Owls football team was an American football team that represented Tempe Normal School (later renamed Arizona State University) as an independent during the 1914 college football season. In their first season under head coach George Schaeffer, the Owls compiled a 4–3 record and were outscored by their opponents by a combined total of 143 to 97. The team's games included a 34–0 loss in the Arizona–Arizona State football rivalry. Gordon Johnston was the team captain.

Schedule

References

Tempe Normal
Arizona State Sun Devils football seasons
Tempe Normal Owls football